Aureolaria pectinata, commonly called combleaf yellow false foxglove, false foxglove, and comb-leaf oakleach, is a species of plant in the broomrape family that is native to the southeastern United States.

It is an annual plant that produces yellow flowers in the late summer on herbaceous stems. It is hemiparisitic, meaning that it gets some of its nutrients from other plants. A. pectinata attaches itself to the roots of oak trees, explaining the common name "oakleach".

References

Flora of North America
pectinata